Thomas Lee Ward (c. 1936 – May 16, 1995) was an American murderer. He was tried, convicted, and executed by lethal injection in Louisiana for the murder of his stepfather-in-law Wilbert John Spencer.

Overview 
On the night of June 22, 1983, Ward arrived by bus in New Orleans, Louisiana from California, where he had just been released from jail after serving 60 days for molesting his 10-year-old daughter. He went to the residence of Lydia and John Spencer, the mother and stepfather of his estranged wife, Linda. Ward's wife and children were also staying at the house. Ward was allowed into the house to visit his children. He asked and was allowed to bathe and freshen up. Ward learned that his wife had begun receiving welfare and the family was having some trouble with one of the daughters. Ward later claimed that this upset him, but rather than saying or doing anything rash, he left the house.
 
He then went to a local bar where he drank vodka and beer and "hit up" with cocaine. Ward returned to the house at approximately 5:30 a.m. the next morning, asking to see his children one last time. After visiting with the children he gave his wife his address and phone number in New York City and then went into the bedroom of his wife's mother and stepfather. He pulled out a gun, pointed it at Wilbert John Spencer and said "I am sorry, John, I have to kill you." He then shot Spencer once at close range. As Lydia Spencer reached for her husband, Ward shot her in the stomach. When she turned around, he shot her in the back. She then ran for the door, trying to get out of the house. Ward followed her, striking her with three more shots. Linda Ward and her brother, Ernest Scott, heard the shooting and ran from the house to get help from the neighbors.
 
When police arrived, Ward walked up to the police officers, apparently to turn himself in. At first, the police did not seize Ward, not yet knowing he was the alleged murderer. Ward claims the police shooed him away because he was drunk. After further investigation at the scene, the police realized who Ward was and arrested him for the murder of Wilbert John Spencer. Lydia Spencer later recovered.

Trial 
Ward was indicted by the Orleans Parish Grand Jury with first-degree murder. On August 15, 1984, the jury at Ward's trial found him guilty as charged. After a sentencing hearing, in which Ward testified, the jury unanimously recommended a sentence of death.

Execution 
Ward was executed by lethal injection at the Louisiana State Penitentiary on May 16, 1995, at the age of 59. He declined to make a final statement, but dictated to his attorney: "I am leaving the world at peace with myself and with the Almighty. I feel remorse for the things that I did. I hope that young people today will learn that violence is not an answer. I hope the legal system learns that lesson, too. The death penalty is not a solution."

See also 

 Capital punishment in Louisiana
 Capital punishment in the United States
 List of people executed in Louisiana

References

Sources 
 Murderers Executed in 2 States. The New York Times (1995-03-17). Retrieved on 2007-11-13.
 State v. Ward, 483 So.2d 578 (La. January 23, 1986).

1936 births
1995 deaths
American people convicted of murder
20th-century executions of American people
20th-century executions by Louisiana
People executed by Louisiana by lethal injection
People convicted of murder by Louisiana